David Watson is an American personality psychologist who has been the Andrew J. McKenna Family Professor of Psychology at the University of Notre Dame since 2010. He previously served as a professor of psychology at the University of Iowa beginning in 1993, and taught at Southern Methodist University before then. He was the founding president of the Association for Research in Personality in 2001 and served as editor-in-chief of the Journal of Abnormal Psychology from 2006 to 2011. He is known for his research on personality assessment and psychopathology, including working with his wife Lee Anna Clark and Auke Tellegen to develop the Positive and Negative Affect Schedule in 1988. In 2015, Watson received the Jack Block Award for Distinguished Research in Personality from the Society for Personality and Social Psychology.

References

External links

University of Notre Dame faculty
Living people
21st-century American psychologists
Santa Clara University alumni
University of Minnesota alumni
Psychology journal editors
University of Iowa faculty
Southern Methodist University faculty
Personality psychologists
Year of birth missing (living people)